The president of Romania serves as the head of state of Romania. The office was created by the communist leader Nicolae Ceaușescu in 1974 and has developed into its modern form after the Romanian Revolution and the adoption of the 1991 constitution. The current president of Romania is Klaus Iohannis, who has been serving since 21 December 2014.

List 

Key regarding the political parties of affiliation

 (PCR)
 (FSN)
 (PSD)
 (PNȚCD)
 (PDL)
 (PNL)

Socialist Republic of Romania (1965–1989)

Romania (1989–present) 

{| class=wikitable style=text-align:center
|-
! rowspan="2" |
! rowspan="2" | Portrait
! rowspan="2" |Name(Birth–Death)
! rowspan="2" |Elected
! colspan="3" width="30%" |Term of office
! rowspan="2" width="35%" |Political Party
! rowspan="2" | Ref.
|-
!Took office
!Left office
!Time in office
|-bgcolor="#EEEEEE"
! bgcolor="#EEEEEE" rowspan="2" style="background:; color:white" | —
| bgcolor="#EEEEEE" rowspan="4" |
| bgcolor="#EEEEEE" rowspan="4" |Ion Iliescu(born 1930)
| rowspan="2" |1990
| 26 December 1989
| 20 June 1990
|176 days
|National Salvation Front (FSN)
| rowspan="2" |
|-
| colspan="4" |A former Romanian Communist Party (PCR) high-ranking member, Iliescu was one of the main founders of the National Salvation Front (FSN) during the 1989 Revolution. As a member of the FSN triumvirate, Iliescu served as the acting head of state of Romania for almost six months during the beginning of its slow transition to free market capitalism.
|-bgcolor="#EEEEEE"
! rowspan="2" style="background:; color:white" | 2
| rowspan="2" |1990 1992
| 20 June 1990
| 29 November 1996
|6 years,

161 days
|National Salvation Front (FSN)
| rowspan="2" |
|-
| colspan="4" | <small>The first Romanian president to have been freely and democratically elected, Ion Iliescu was an "independent social democrat" in geopolitical regards. He subsequently earned a negative and populistic reputation after his handling of the Mineriads miner interventions in Bucharest. Under his first term, the current Constitution of Romania was introduced.</small>
|- bgcolor=#EEEEEE
! rowspan="2" style="background:; color:white" | 3
| rowspan="2" | 
| rowspan="2" |Emil Constantinescu(born 1939)
| rowspan="2" |1996
| 29 November 1996
| 20 December 2000
|4 years,
21 days
|Christian Democratic National Peasants' Party (PNȚCD)1
| rowspan="2" | 
|-
| colspan="4" style="font-size:85%;"|Constantinescu was the successful candidate of the right-leaning Romanian Democratic Convention (CDR) which won the 1996 general elections, consequently paving the way for the first peaceful transfer of power in post-1989 Romania. During his term as president, Constantinescu struggled with the slow implementation of the modernization and privatization process which was bogged down by excessive bureaucracy.

Nonetheless, the CDR coalition managed to secure three prime ministers who initiated liberalizing economic reforms under Constantinescu's presidency, although the overall progress on a short-term basis was slower than initially expected.
|- bgcolor="#EEEEEE"
! rowspan="2" style="background:; color:white" | (2)
| rowspan="2" |
| rowspan="2" |Ion Iliescu(born 1930)
| rowspan="2" |2000
| 20 December 2000
| 20 December 2004
|4 years
|Social Democratic Party (PSD)
| rowspan="2" |
|-
| colspan="4" |Iliescu was elected to his third non-consecutive term in 2000. In March 2004, at the end of his last term, Romania joined the North Atlantic Treaty Organization (NATO), as part of the second largest wave of expansion in Central and Eastern Europe.
|- bgcolor="#EEEEEE"
! rowspan="2" style="background:; color:white" | 4
| rowspan="2" |
| rowspan="2" |Traian Băsescu(born 1951)
| rowspan="2" |2004 2009
| 20 December 2004
| 21 December 2014
|10 years,
1 day
|Democratic Liberal Party (PDL)2
| rowspan="2" | 
|-
| colspan="4" style="font-size:85%;" | Elected with the support of the right-leaning Justice and Truth Alliance (DA), Băsescu won the presidency in 2004 on a platform targeting widespread political corruption. During his first term, Romania joined in the European Union (EU). It was also during his first mandate as president that he managed to solve a hostage crisis in Iraq, resulting in the rescue of three Romanian journalists. In spite of the harsh opposition of the left-leaning parties (especially the PSD and the PRM), he publicly condemned the former Communist regime.

His second term was marked by a landslide victory of the opposition coalition, specifically the Social Liberal Union (USL), in both the local and the legislative elections of 2012, amidst heavy losses for the presidential party (i.e. the Democratic Liberal Party).

Internationally, Băsescu aligned Romania closer to the United States, the European Union (EU), and NATO, maintaining a pro-Western foreign policy throughout both his terms. He was suspended twice, namely in 2007 and 2012. Both impeachment referendums were invalidated by the Constitutional Court on the grounds of low turnout, thus paving his way for a comeback to presidency.

|- bgcolor="#EEEEEE"
! rowspan=2 style="background:; color:black" | 5
|rowspan=2|
|rowspan=2|Klaus Iohannis(born 1959)
|rowspan=2|2014 2019
| 21 December 2014
|Incumbent
|
|National Liberal Party (PNL)
|rowspan=2|
|-
| colspan="4"| <small>Elected with the support of the right-leaning Christian Liberal Alliance (ACL), Johannis surprisingly won against former close USL ally and coalition partner Victor Ponta in the run-off of the 2014 Romanian presidential elections. During the presidential campaign, his platform focused on anti-corruption, judicial independence, and fiscal relaxation. He is also the first Romanian President to have stemmed from an ethnic minority, as he is of German (more specifically Transylvanian Saxon) origin. 

In the wake of the 2016 legislative elections, his first presidential term was marked by the frequent change of prime ministers made by his former and current close allies, the socialists, as well as by the most massive and widespread series of protests to have ever occurred in the history of Romania (which were directed against the political corruption endorsed at high level by the socialist governments controlled from behind by former PSD leader Liviu Dragnea). 

After defeating PSD candidate Viorica Dăncilă by a landslide in both presidential election rounds in late 2019, his second term has been marked by the COVID-19 pandemic and by tremendous political instability (resulting in the 2021 Romanian political crisis) given the extremely corrupt governments he has endorsed after the 2020 legislative elections, in their composition being also his closest political allies, the social democrats/socialists, which he has endorsed at governance even more than Ion Iliescu. Furthermore, a major setback and failure during his second term was Romania's blocked entrance within the Schengen Area, given Austria's veto vote in December 2022.
|-
|}Notes''':

1 Emil Constantinescu was the candidate of the Christian Democratic National Peasants' Party (PNȚCD) whose candidacy was supported as part of the larger right-leaning Romanian Democratic Convention (CDR) in both 1992 and 1996;

2 Traian Băsescu was the presidential candidate of the Democratic Party (PD) whose candidacy was supported as part of the larger right-leaning Justice and Truth Alliance (DA) in 2004, alongside the National Liberal Party. In 2009, his re-election was supported only by the Democratic Liberal Party (PDL) along with a certain faction of the Christian Democratic National Peasants' Party (PNȚCD).

 Acting presidents (2007; 2012) 

 Timeline 

See also
Domnitor
King of Romania
List of heads of state of Romania
List of presidents of Romania by time in office

Notes

References

 Bulei, Ion, O istorie a românilor'', Editura Meronia, București, 2007, pg. 266-267

Romania
List
List
Presidents